Alexander Neubauer (born 15 July 1986) is an Austrian ice hockey player currently playing for Kapfenberg (in the province Styria) of the Austrian Nationalliga.

Neubauer began his career with VSV EC in 2003 and remained with the team until 2006 when he joined Graz 99ers.

External links

1986 births
Austrian ice hockey defencemen
Graz 99ers players
Living people
EC VSV players
Place of birth missing (living people)